James Sieveright was a Scottish-born Canadian farmer and community leader.

He was born in Aberdeenshire about 1812, the son of English parents, and came to Upper Canada with his parents in 1824. He became the first reeve of Gloucester Township in 1850 and served a second term as reeve in 1865. Sieveright was also captain in the local militia and justice of the peace. In 1858, he married Isabella P. Smith.

The memory of James Sieveright remains in the name of a road in that township, in an area formerly rural but now part of Ottawa's Blossom Park suburb.

References 
 Historical Sketch of the County of Carleton (1971) - originally published in 1879, reprinted by Mika Press, Belleville, Ontario

Mayors and reeves of Gloucester Township, Ontario
Scottish emigrants to pre-Confederation Ontario
Canadian people of Scottish descent
Immigrants to Upper Canada